Grästorp is a locality and the seat of Grästorp Municipality in Västra Götaland County, Sweden. It had 2,969 inhabitants in 2010. It is the only locality in Grästorp Municipality.

Sports
The following sports clubs are located in Grästorp:

 IK Gauthiod
 Grästorps IK

References

External links 
 

Municipal seats of Västra Götaland County
Swedish municipal seats
Populated places in Västra Götaland County
Populated places in Grästorp Municipality